František Donda (born 1890, date of death unknown) was a Czech equestrian. He competed in the individual dressage event at the 1924 Summer Olympics.

References

External links
 

1890 births
Year of death missing
Czech male equestrians
Olympic equestrians of Czechoslovakia
Equestrians at the 1924 Summer Olympics
Place of birth missing